Lagadin is a small tourist village in the municipality of Ohrid, North Macedonia, located 9 kilometres south of the city of Ohrid. It is a popular beachside destination along Lake Ohrid and lies at the foot of Galičica National Park.

Demographics
As of the 2021 census, Lagadin had 81 residents with the following ethnic composition:
Macedonians 79
Persons for whom data are taken from administrative sources 1
Others 1

According to the 2002 census, the village had a total of 20 inhabitants. Ethnic groups in the village include:
Macedonians 18
Serbs 1
Others 1

References

Villages in Ohrid Municipality